T. J. Ryan (born 12 November 1974) is an Irish hurling selector and player. He is a former manager of the Limerick senior hurling team.

Born in Garryspillane, County Limerick, Ryan first arrived on the inter-county scene when he first linked up with the Limerick minor team, before later joining the under-21 side. He made his senior debut during the 1994 championship. Ryan played a key role for Limerick for over a decade and won two Munster medals and one National Hurling League medal. He was an All-Ireland runner-up on two occasions.

As a member of the Munster inter-provincial team on a number of occasions, Ryan won two Railway Cup medals in 2000 and 2001. At club level he is a one-time championship medallist with Garryspillane.

Throughout his inter-county career Ryan made 40 championship appearances for Limerick. He announced his retirement from inter-county hurling on 25 July 2006.

In retirement from playing Ryan became involved in team management and coaching at club and inter-county levels. He had a successful tenure as manager of the Kilworth club team, before later being appointed selector with the Limerick senior team and manager with the Limerick under-21 team. Ryan was appointed joint-manager of the Limerick senior team in 2013, taking full responsibility the following year after the departure of Dónal O'Grady.

Playing career

Club

Ryan plays his club hurling with the local Garryspillane team and has enjoyed much success in a club career that has spanned three decades. He first came to prominence as a member of the club's under-12 team, capturing a county championship medal in 1986.

After little success at minor level, Ryan was a member of the Garryspillane under-21 team that secured the championship title in 1995.  By this stage he had already moved onto the club's senior team.  He won a county intermediate championship title in 1996, as Garryspillane gained promotion to the top flight of club hurling in Limerick.

After championship decider defeats by Patrickswell in 1997 and by Ahane in 2004, it was third time lucky for Garryspillane in 2005. A 2-15 to 2-12 defeat of near neighbours Kilmallock gave Ryan a Limerick Senior Hurling Championship medal.

Ryan played his last club game on 11 September 2009 in a 1-15 to 1-9 relegation play-off defeat of Tournafulla.

Inter-county

Beginning his inter-county career with the Limerick minor team in 1992, Ryan later joined the under-21 team but enjoyed little success in either grade.

Ryan was just nineteen when he made his senior championship debut on 5 June 1994 in a 4-14 to 4-11 Munster quarter-final defeat of Cork. He later lined out in his first provincial decider with Clare providing the opposition.  A 0-25 to 2-10 rout gave Limerick their first provincial title in thirteen years and gave Ryan his first Munster medal. Limerick subsequently qualified to meet Offaly in the All-Ireland final.  It looked as if Ryan's side were going to make history and claim the title as Limerick had a five-point lead with as many minutes left. Offaly suddenly sprang to life following a Johnny Dooley goal from a close-in free.  Following the puck-out Offaly worked the ball up the field and Pat O'Connor struck for a second goal. The Offaly forwards scored another five unanswered points in the time remaining to secure a 3-16 to 2-13 victory.  It was a bitter blow for Limerick who looked as if they had one hand on the Liam MacCarthy Cup.

Limerick surrendered their Munster title to Clare in 1995, however, both sides met in the opening round of the championship the following year.  Ryan's side emerged victorious thanks to a remarkable point from Ciarán Carey, described by many as the greatest match-winner of all-time. Limerick later faced Tipperary in the provincial final and looked to be heading out of the championship as Tipp took a ten-point lead.  Ryan's side battled back to secure a 0-19 to 1-16 draw and a second chance to defeat their near rivals.  The replay also saw Tipperary take a decisive lead, however, Limerick's goal-scoring ability was the deciding factor.  A 4-7 to 0-16 score line gave Limerick the title and gave Ryan a second Munster medal.  The subsequent All-Ireland final pitted Limerick against Wexford for the first time in over forty years.  The game was far from a classic, however, it did provide excitement. Tom Dempsey was the hero of the day as he scored a goal after nineteen minutes to give Wexford a major advantage. His side led by 1-8 to 0-10 at half-time in spite of having Éamonn Scallan sent off. Wexford took a four-point lead in the second-half, however, this was whittled back to two points as Wexford hung on for the last twenty minutes. The final score of 1-13 to 0-14 showed how vital Dempsey's goal was.

Ryan won a National Hurling League medal in 1997 following a 1-12 to 1-9 defeat of Galway in the decider.

The rest of Ryan's career failed to reach the heights of his first three years on the team. Following a 2-16 to 1-17 defeat by Tipperary in 2001, Limerick failed to win a single game in the provincial championship over the following five years, while the All-Ireland qualifiers also proved to be an unhappy hunting ground for Limerick.

Ryan's last game for Limerick was a narrow 0-19 to 0-18 All-Ireland quarter-final defeat by Cork on 22 July 2006. He announced his retirement from inter-county hurling three days later.

Inter-provincial

Ryan also had the honour of being selected for the Munster team in the inter-provincial series of games.  He first lined out for his province in 2000 as Munster faced arch-rivals Leinster in the decider.  That game ended in victory for Ryan, who came on as a sub for Alan Markham, as the southerners won by 3-15 to 2-15.  It was a first Railway Cup winners' medal for Ryan.

Ryan was named on the Munster starting fifteen for the final time in 2001.  On that occasion Munster faced Connacht in the decider, however, the southerners had a comfortable 1-21 to 1-15 victory and Ryan collected his second Railway Cup title.

Management career

Kilworth

In 2012 Ryan coached Cork intermediate club Kilworth to the final of the championship. Kanturk provided the opposition and took a 1-4 to no score lead after just ten minutes. Kanturk's shooting left them down as they registered eighteen wides over the course of the hour, with Kilworth claiming a narrow 2-15 to 2-13 victory.

Limerick

In September 2010 Ryan, alongside former teammates Ciarán Carey and Pat Heffernan, was named as a selector in Dónal O'Grady's new Limerick senior hurling management team. The new management team restored order to the Limerick senior hurling team, who had been on strike and refused to play the previous year. Limerick claimed the National League (Division 2) title in 2011 following a 4-12 to 2-13 defeat of Clare. Limerick's championship run came to an end following the team's defeat by Dublin in the All-Ireland quarter-final. This brought an end to O'Grady and his management team's tenure in charge.

After a year out of inter-county hurling, Ryan was appointed manager of the Limerick intermediate team in 2012. His sole season in charge saw Limerick defeated by 0-20 to 0-15 by Tipperary in the Munster semi-final.

In November 2013 Ryan was named as the new joint manager of the Limerick senior hurling team, alongside former boss Dónal O'Grady. After a league campaign which saw Limerick finish second to Cork in Division 1A, Limerick's championship plans were thrown into turmoil when Dónal O'Grady resigned as joint-manager and coach on 20 April 2014. This followed an altercation with the Limerick County Board who falsely claimed at a meeting that the co-managers had "apologised for the abysmal" displays during the league.

On 11 July 2016, Ryan resigned as manager of the Limerick team after three seasons in charge. His final match in charge was the 0-19 to 0-15 defeat to Clare in round 2 of the All-Ireland Qualifiers on 9 July.

Honours

Player

Garryspillane
 Limerick Senior Hurling Championship (1): 2005
 Limerick Intermediate Hurling Championship (1): 1996
 Limerick Under-21 Hurling Championship (1): 1995
 Limerick Under-12 Hurling Championship (1): 1986

Limerick
Munster Senior Hurling Championship (2): 1994, 1996
National Hurling League (1): 1997

Munster
Railway Cup (2): 2000, 2001

Selector

Limerick
National Hurling League (Division 2) (1): 2011

Manager

Kilworth
Cork Intermediate Hurling Championship (1): 2012

References

1974 births
Living people
Garryspillane hurlers
Limerick inter-county hurlers
Munster inter-provincial hurlers
Hurling selectors
Hurling managers